Blackham is an English surname. Notable people with the surname include:

 Blackham baronets
 Denis Blackham (born 1952), British audio engineer
 Dorothy Blackham (1896–1975), Irish illustrator, artist and teacher
 Ernest Blackham (1898–1966), English footballer
 Fred Blackham (1873–1967), Australian rules footballer
 H. J. Blackham (1903–2009), British humanist philosopher, writer and educationalist
 Jack Blackham (1854–1932), Australian cricketer
 Jeremy Blackham (born 1943), British Royal Navy officer 
 Joan Blackham (1946–2020), British actress
 Joyce Blackham (1934–2018), British opera singer
 Robert J. Blackham (1868–1951), author, doctor and army officer
 Sam Blackham (1890–1956), English footballer

See also
Blackham, English village
Blackham Coliseum, located in Lafayette, Louisiana

Surnames of English origin